Pete's Meteor is an Irish drama film released in 1998. It was written and directed by Joe O'Byrne and stars Mike Myers.

Mike Myers plays a drug dealer living in the slums of Dublin.  He tries to financially provide for the three children of his dead brother.  The children's lives are forever changed when a meteor crashes into their backyard.  Alfred Molina plays a wealthy scientist that the children must confront to retrieve their heaven sent gift.

Reception
Christopher Null of Contactmusic.com awarded the film two stars out of five and wrote, “The story doesn't help matters, and sheer insanity is not much of a substitute for actual character development.”

Nathan Rabin of The Dissolve gave the film a negative review and wrote, “It doesn’t help that the child actors deliver performances so terrible, they may actually persuade audiences to root against a trio of hard-luck orphans.”  Rabin also added, “I recommend Pete’s Meteor to bad-movie aficionados.”

References

External links 
 
 

1998 films
1998 drama films
Irish drama films
1990s English-language films